Angepena Station is a pastoral lease operating as a sheep station in South Australia.

The property was established in 1855 by John Baker, who had applied for the Angepena and Pernunna leases the previous year. Baker appointed John Stewart to manage the property. The following year a hut-keeper employed at the property was murdered by Aboriginal people. After the attack Baker asked for police protection and a police station was built later the same year, staffed by four troopers.

It 1904 the owner was J. Snell. The Snell family still owned and resided at the property in 1966.

In 1966 the property was bought by Waraweena proprietors and was run by Mr and Mrs SW Nicholls.
 
In 2007 the station was placed on the market and was going to be sold to a youth support organization, Operation Flinders. The traditional owners of the area, the Adnyamathanha people, who had been trying to buy a property in the region for the previous eight years, were devastated and asked the government to halt the sale. 
The sale was called off by Mr SW Nicholls, who then sold it to his son Mr & Mrs AS Nicholls.

The land occupying the extent of the Angepena pastoral lease was gazetted by the Government of South Australia as a locality in April 2013 under the name "Angepena".

Currently Angepena is run as a sheep and cattle station and has been owned and run continuously for the last 50 years by the Nicholls family.

See also
List of ranches and stations

References

Pastoral leases in South Australia
Stations (Australian agriculture)
1855 establishments in Australia
Far North (South Australia)